David Ramseyer (born 11 January 1987) is a Swiss-French basketball player for AMSB of the LNB Pro B.

Professional career
In the past, he also played for the Lions de Geneve.

From 2012 to 2014 he played for the French league Pro-A club Boulazac Basket Dordogne. In March 2017, he signed for Swiss top-tier team Union Neuchâtel Basket.

International career
He has been a member of the Swiss national basketball team.

References

1987 births
Living people
Centers (basketball)
Forwards (basketball)
French men's basketball players
Lions de Genève players
Olympique Antibes basketball players
Sportspeople from Roanne
Sportspeople from Geneva
Swiss expatriate basketball people in France
Swiss men's basketball players
Swiss people of French descent
Union Neuchâtel Basket players